Ostrov (also called Ostrov nad Ohří;) is a town in Karlovy Vary District in the Karlovy Vary Region of the Czech Republic. It has about 16,000 inhabitants. The historic town centre is well preserved and is protected by law as an urban monument zone.

Administrative parts
Town parts and villages of Arnoldov, Dolní Žďár, Hanušov, Hluboký, Horní Žďár, Kfely, Květnová, Liticov, Maroltov, Mořičov and Vykmanov are administrative parts of Ostrov.

Etymology
The original name of the first settlement was Zlaukowerde (meaning "Slauko's island"), which changed into the German name Schlackenwerth. In 1331, the name Ostrov (i.e. "island") was first used, in a charter of King John of Bohemia.

Geography
Most of the municipal territory lies in the Sokolov Basin, but it also extends to the Doupov Mountains in the east and to the Ore Mountains in the north. The town lies at the confluence of the Bystřice River and Jáchymovský Creek, the Ohře flows just outside the territory. The southern part of the territory is rich in ponds.

History

Ostrov was probably founded by Slauko I Hrabišic at the beginning of the 13th century. A hoax from the second half of the 13th century mentioned the Church of Saint James the Great in 1208, but the church was built in 1224–1226. The first trustworthy written mention of Ostrov is from 1269.

During the rule of King Ottokar II of Bohemia, the settlement became a royal town. This lasted until the 15th century, when the Schlick family bought the town. In 1625, the town was acquired by Julius Henry, Duke of Saxe-Lauenburg. He decided to make Ostrov the residence of his house. He had the local castle rebuilt and extended, and founded a Piarist monastery with a Latin school.

Today's appearance of the old town was determined mainly by construction activities after the last great fire in 1866. From the 19th century to 1918, Ostrov belonged to one of the branches of the imperial House of Habsburg, the Grand Dukes of Tuscany. In the 19th century, the town was industrialized. A smelter, a cardboard factory and a porcelain factory were established.

After World War I, being located in the historic region of Bohemia, Ostrov became part of newly established Czechoslovakia, although it had a German majority and only 7% of the Czech population. At the beginning of World War II, during the occupation of Czechoslovakia by Nazi Germany, the Czech population was forced to leave the town. The castle was turned into a Nazi concentration camp, a subcamp of the Flossenbürg concentration camp, whose prisoners were mostly Poles and Russians. In April 1945, most of the remaining prisoners were deported by the Germans to the Leitmeritz concentration camp. After the war, the German population was expelled in accordance with the Potsdam Agreement and replaced by Czechs.

The population of Ostrov then multiplied as people were moved to work in the uranium mines in nearby Jáchymov. The extensive housing blocks from the 1950s forming the new part of Ostrov are considered one of the best examples of socialist realism architecture in the Czech Republic.

Demographics

Economy

From 1960, the town was known for production of Škoda trolleybuses for many decades, but this ended in 2004.

The largest employer based in the town is Witte Access Technology, a branch of Witte Automotive. It produces painted door handles for automotive industry. The traditional industry has been the production of cardboard since 1889. Papos company is the largest cardboard manufacturer in the country.

Transport
The I/13 from Karlovy Vary to Liberec passess through the town.

Ostrov is located on the interregional railway line Prague–Cheb.

Sights

The landmark of the historic centre is the Ostrov Castle. It is an extensive complex of buildings with a castle park. An old guarding castle was rebuilt into a Renaissance residence at the turn of the 15th and 16th centuries. In the 1640s, it was rebuilt and extended, and another castle building (the so-called Palace of Princes) was added at the end of the 17th century. Today the main building with a roofed courtyard houses the town hall, expositions of the history of the castle and the porcelain production in the town, and the information centre. The Palace of Princes serves as the town library, its Václav Havel's Orangery is used for exhibitions and concerts.

The English-style castle park was originally a formal castle garden founded in 1625. In the centre of the park is the baroque summer house from 1673–1679. It houses a branch of the Karlovy Vary Art Gallery with exhibitions of mostly contemporary art and an exhibition of European porcelain.

The monastery complex is located next to the castle park. The Piarist monastery was founded in 1644. The early Baroque complex includes the Church of the Annunciation from 1666–1673, the funeral Chapel of Saint Anne from 1644, the Chapel of Saint Florian from 1692–1693, and the Chapel of the Virgin Mary of Einsiedeln from 1709–1710. There are various expositions in the church and chapels, the convent building is closed to the public.

The parish Church of Saint Michael and Mary, Virgin Most Faithful dates from the late 13th century. It was reconstructed after fires between 1567 and 1572, and then rebuilt again in 1607–1609 and 1636. Several Renaissance tombstones have been preserved, the most valuable of which is the tombstone from 1521 with a Schlick epitaph.

The Church of Saint James the Great from the 1220s was originally a Romanesque parish church. In the 16th century, it became a cemetery church. At the beginning of the 17th century, it was reconstructed in the early Baroque style.

Red Tower of Death is a red-brick tower that served in 1951–1956 as a sorting house for uranium ore in Vykmanov work camp. Today it is a national cultural monument and, since 2019, it has been a UNESCO World Heritage Site as a part of the Ore Mountain Mining Region.

Notable people

Joachim Andreas von Schlick (1569–1621), nobleman
Augustin Pfleger (1635–1686), composer
Johann Caspar Ferdinand Fischer (1662–1746), organist, Hofkapellmeister and composer
Johann Josef Loschmidt (1821–1895), physicist and chemist; attended the local school in 1833–37
Vilma Cibulková (born 1963), actress
Radim Rulík (born 1965), ice hockey coach
Horst Siegl (born 1969), footballer
Petr Maděra (born 1970), writer
Lukáš Bauer (born 1977), cross-country skier
Jiří Štoček (born 1977), chess grandmaster
Zbyněk Drda (born 1987), singer

Twin towns – sister cities

Ostrov is twinned with:
 Rastatt, Germany
 Wunsiedel, Germany

Gallery

References

External links

 
Official tourist portal

Cities and towns in the Czech Republic
Populated places in Karlovy Vary District